Casthanaea or Casthanea or Kasthanaia or Kasthaneia or Castanea or Kastanaia (Κασταναία) was a town and polis (city-state) of Ancient Magnesia, at the foot of Mount Pelium, with a temple of Aphrodite Casthanitis. It is mentioned by Herodotus in his account of the terrible storm which the fleet of Xerxes I experienced off this part of the coast. It was from this town that the chestnut tree, which still abounds on the eastern side of Mt. Pelium, derived its name in Greek and the modern languages of Europe. Its location is at the modern village of Keramidi.

References 

Former populated places in Greece
Ancient Magnesia
Populated places in ancient Thessaly
Cities in ancient Greece
Thessalian city-states